Interstate 475 may refer to:
 Interstate 475 (Georgia), a bypass of Macon, Georgia
 Interstate 475 (Michigan), a bypass of Flint, Michigan
 Interstate 475 (Ohio), a bypass of Toledo, Ohio
 Interstate 475 (Tennessee), a proposed Interstate Highway that was cancelled in the Knoxville area

75-4
4